, first called Jūbei from his clan and later  from his title, was a Japanese samurai general of the Sengoku period best known as the assassin of Oda Nobunaga. Mitsuhide was a bodyguard of Ashikaga Yoshiaki and later a successful general under daimyō Nobunaga during his war of political unification in Japan.

Mitsuhide rebelled against Nobunaga for unknown reasons in the Honnō-ji Incident in 1582, forcing the unprotected Nobunaga to commit seppuku in Kyoto.

Mitsuhide attempted to establish himself as shōgun, but was pursued by Nobunaga's successor Toyotomi Hideyoshi and defeated at the Battle of Yamazaki. The 13-days short reign of Mitsuhide is listed as the inspiration for the yojijukugo set phrase .

He is still popular in present culture. A ceremonial activity was held on April 15, 2018, in Kyoto.

Early life

Akechi Mitsuhide was believed to be born on 10 March 1528 in Tara Castle, Mino Province (present-day Kani, Gifu Prefecture) Mitsuhide was a descendant of the Toki-Akechi family of the shugo Toki clan. Mitsuhide is rumored to be a childhood friend or cousin of Nōhime. It is believed that he was raised to be a general among 10,000 by Saitō Dōsan and the Toki clan during their governorship of the Mino Province. When Dōsan's son, Saitō Yoshitatsu, rebelled against his father in 1556, Mitsuhide sided with Dōsan.

Service under Ashikaga Shogunate and Oda clan
Mitsuhide began serving the "wandering shōgun" Ashikaga Yoshiaki as one of his guardians under Hosokawa Fujitaka. Shōgun Ashikaga Yoshiaki ordered Asakura Yoshikage to be his official protector, an offer which Yoshikage declined. Yoshiaki appealed to Mitsuhide, who suggested Oda Nobunaga instead.

In 1567, after Nobunaga conquest of Mino province, and paved the way through Omi province to Kyoto. 
In November 1568, Nobunaga, Yoshiaki and Mitsuhide arrived in Kyoto, the capital of Japan, and Nobunaga made Yoshiaki the next shogun and turned Honkoku-ji temple into a temporary Shogun palace.

In 1569, after Nobunaga and his followers returned from Kyoto on January 4, the Miyoshi clan attacked Ashikaga Yoshiaki at Honkoku-ji, known as "Honkokuji Incident". At the battle of Honkokuji, Mitsuhide managed to defend the shōgun and repulsed the Miyoshi clan. Then Nobunaga asked Mitsuhide to join his army and Mitsuhide decided to serve under the Shōgun and also join Nobunaga.

In 1570, at the Siege of Kanegasaki in Echizen Province. Mitsuhide joined Hideyoshi to serve as the rear-guard for the departing forces. 

In 1571, after the successful attack at the Ikkō-ikki Enryaku-ji temple, Mitsuhide received Sakamoto area and built Sakamoto Castle. Although Nobunaga rarely put too much trust in his retainers, he particularly trusted Shibata Katsuie, Hashiba Hideyoshi, and Akechi Mitsuhide, who was the first subordinate to receive a castle from Nobunaga.

In 1572, Mitsuhide continued serving Shogun Yoshiaki by contributing to the campaign in Kawachi Province.

In 1573, after Ashikaga Yoshiaki raised arms against Nobunaga. Mitsuhide split from Yoshiaki and served as a senior retainer of Nobunaga in battles at Ishiyama Castle and Imakatata Castle.

In 1574, after Ashikaga Shogunate come to end, Mitsuhide served as a dual magistrate, assessing taxes on temple holdings in Kyōto and its environs.

In 1575, after Battle of Nagashino, Nobunaga send Akechi Mitsuhide to take control of Tanba province. Mitsuhide attempted diplomacy and won over a number of the smaller local lords to his side; however, Akai clan were adamant in their opposition, and Mitsuhide was forced to lay siege to Kuroi Castle for two months in the winter of 1575. Later, he was awarded the Court titles of "Junior Fifth Rank (Lower)", "Governor of Hyūga" and the honorary title of "Koretō Hyūga-no-kami".

In April 1576, Mitsuhide, along with Hosokawa Fujitaka, Harada Naomasa and Araki Murashige took part at battle of Tennoji as the main army of Siege of Ishiyama Hongan-ji against Ikkō-ikki rebellion. In the meantime, Hatano clan from Tanba under Hatano Hideharu declared independence and turned against Nobunaga.

In 1577, Mitsuhide along with Hosokawa Fujitaka and Tsutsui Junkei aided Oda Nobutada in the Siege of Shigisan to defeat Matsunaga Hisahide, who had rebelled against Nobunaga. 
Later, Mitsuhide took part in  the Battle of Tedorigawa against Uesugi Kenshin.

In 1578, After Hatano Hideharu rebellion, Nobunaga ordered again Mitsuhide to invade Tanba Province. Mitsuhide moved to pacify the Tanba by defeating several clans, such as the leader of the Hatano clan's retainers, the Akai clan, Akai Naomasa also known as "Red Demon of Tanba" at second siege of Kuroi castle. Later, Mitsuhide received Kameyama castle and Tanba Province with fief 550,000 koku.

In 1579, Mitsuhide forces captured Yakami Castle from Hatano Hideharu by promising Hideharu peace terms; however, Nobunaga betrayed the peace agreement and had Hideharu executed. This reputedly displeased the Hatano family. As a result, several of Hideharu's retainers murdered Akechi Mitsuhide's mother (or aunt). The failing relationship between Nobunaga and Mitsuhide was further fueled through several public insults which Nobunaga directed at Mitsuhide.

In 1580, after Nobunaga banished Sakuma Nobumori and his son Sakuma Nobuhide to the temple on Mount Koyasan, Mitsuhide replaced Nobumori command and came to lead the largest force in the Kinki area (Kansai) and along with the severe human affairs which brought unrest to the vassals, this banishment was often said to be linked to the Honnoji Incident.

In 1581, Nobunaga assigned Mitsuhide to manage the "Kyōto Mounted Horse Parade" (Kyōto ouma-zoroi), a large-scale military parade held to the east of the Imperial Palace in Kyōto.

Honnō-ji Incident

In 1582, Mitsuhide was ordered by Nobunaga to march west to assist Hashiba Hideyoshi who was at that time fighting the Mōri clan. Ignoring his orders, Mitsuhide assembled an army of 13,000 soldiers and moved against Nobunaga's position at Honnō-ji. On June 21, Mitsuhide was quoted as saying, "The enemy is at Honnō-ji!" His army surrounded the temple and eventually set it on fire. Oda Nobunaga was killed either during the fighting, or by his own hand. Nobunaga's son, Oda Nobutada, fled the scene, but was surrounded at Nijō Castle and killed. Despite not killing Nobunaga personally, Mitsuhide claimed responsibility for his death.

Mitsuhide's betrayal of the Oda shocked the capital, and he was forced to move quickly to secure his position. Mitsuhide looted Azuchi castle to reward his men and maintain their loyalty.

Mitsuhide attempted to make gestures of friendship to a panicked Imperial Court; he also made many attempts to win over the other clans, but to no avail.

Meanwhile, Hosokawa Fujitaka, to whom he was related through marriage, quickly cut ties with him, as well as Tsutsui Junkei, who refused to take Akechi's side, and half-heartedly supported Hideyoshi.

Death

Mitsuhide had counted on Toyotomi Hideyoshi being occupied fighting with the Mori, and unable to respond to Mitsuhide's coup d'état. However, having learned of the assassination of his lord, Hideyoshi quickly signed a peace treaty with the Mori, and alongside Tokugawa Ieyasu rushed to be the first to avenge Nobunaga. Hideyoshi force marched his army to Settsu in four days, and caught Mitsuhide off guard.

Mitsuhide had been unable to garner support for his cause, and his army had dwindled down to 10,000 men. Hideyoshi, however, had won over former Oda retainers, including Niwa Nagahide and Ikeda Tsuneoki, and had a strength of 20,000 men. In July 2, 1582, the two forces met at the Battle of Yamazaki.

Battle of Yamazaki

Mitsuhide took up a position south of Shōryūji Castle, securing his right flank by the Yodo river, and his left at the foot of the 270-metre Tennozan. Hideyoshi immediately seized the advantage by securing the heights of Tennōzan; his vanguard then maneuvered to face the Akechi forces along the Enmyōji river.

Mitsuhide's forces made a failed attempt to force Hideyoshi from Tennōzan. Ikeda Tsuneoki moved to reinforce Hideyoshi's right flank, which soon crossed Enmyōji-gawa and turned the Akechi flank. Simultaneously, Hideyoshi's forces marched against the Akechi front; this started a rout, only two hours after the battle had begun.

Mitsuhide's men fled, with the exception of the 200 men under Mimaki Kaneaki, who charged and were destroyed by Hideyoshi's larger force. Soon, panic set in among the Akechi army, and Hideyoshi's army chased them back to Shōryūji, where the garrison collapsed. Akechi was later killed while fleeing the battle of Yamazaki by the bandit leader Nakamura Chōbei.

Family
Father: Akechi Mitsutsuna
Mother: Daughter of the Wakasa Takeda clan
Wife: Tsumaki Hiroko
Sons:
Akechi Mitsuyoshi
Daughters:
Hosokawa Gracia: Wife of Hosokawa Tadaoki; ancestor of Empress Shōken
Relatives
Akechi Mitsuharu: Cousin
Akechi Hidemitsu: Adopted son (and son-in-law); ancestor of Sakamoto Ryōma
Nōhime: Cousin; Saitō Dōsan daughter; Wife of Oda Nobunaga

Legacy

Tensho Koshirae sword
The sword of Mitsuhide is the Tensho style; the 'Tensho Koshirae' was first designed to be a replica of Akechi Mitsuhide's own sword. 
The Akechi family was able to trace their heritage to the Toki clan and from there to the Minamoto clan.

Castles built or reconstructed by Mitsuhide
Mitsuhide was well known as a master of castle construction, and was engaged in the construction of many castles.

Sakamoto Castle , Main base of Akechi clan.(Mitsuhide's residence)
Fukuchiyama Castle
Kameyama Castle, In 2019, Akechi Mistuhide's statue was built in the castle.
Shūzan Castle
Kinzan Castle
Kuroi Castle
Shūchi Castle
Usayama Castle

See also
 People of the Sengoku period in popular culture

References

Further reading

1520s births
1582 deaths
Akechi clan
Daimyo
Japanese warriors killed in battle
Oda retainers
People of Azuchi–Momoyama-period Japan
People of Muromachi-period Japan
Samurai
Leaders who took power by coup
Japanese assassins
Japanese Buddhists
People from Gifu Prefecture